Mona Jönsson (born March 18, 1951) is a Swedish Green Party politician. She was a member of the Riksdag from 2002 to 2006.

References

External links
Chatrine Pålsson Ahlgren at the Riksdag website

Members of the Riksdag from the Green Party
Living people
1951 births
Women members of the Riksdag
Members of the Riksdag 2002–2006
21st-century Swedish women politicians
Place of birth missing (living people)